Rick Schofield (born April 23, 1987) is a Canadian professional ice hockey center currently playing for Nürnberg Ice Tigers who compete in the Deutsche Eishockey Liga (DEL).

Playing career
Undrafted, on March 21, 2011, the Anaheim Ducks of the National Hockey League (NHL) signed Schofield as a free agent to a one-year entry-level contract. He was assigned to the American Hockey League, where he played with affiliate, the Syracuse Crunch, and later the Rochester Americans.

On August 28, 2013, Schofield opted to pursue a European career, signing a contract with the new EBEL entrant, HC Bolzano of Italy.

After two successful seasons with Bolzano, including claiming the Austrian Championship in its inaugural season, Schofield left the club as a free agent and signed a one-year contract with fellow EBEL club, EC VSV on April 14, 2015. In the 2015–16 season, Schofield featured in 48 games with Villach, contributing with 34 points.

On April 26, 2016, Schofiled joined his third EBEL in two-years in agreeing to a one-year contract with EHC Black Wings Linz.

References

External links

1987 births
Living people
EHC Black Wings Linz players
Bolzano HC players
Canadian ice hockey centres
Lake Superior State Lakers men's ice hockey players
Nürnberg Ice Tigers players
People from Pickering, Ontario
Ice hockey people from Ontario
EC Red Bull Salzburg players
Rochester Americans players
Syracuse Crunch players
EC VSV players
Canadian expatriate ice hockey players in Austria
Canadian expatriate ice hockey players in Italy